2007 Hyderabad bombings may refer to:

Mecca Masjid bombing, 18 May 2007 
25 August 2007 Hyderabad bombings